Irakli Mekvabishvili (born May 11, 1973) is Georgian Banker and Economist, who has served as Auditor General of Georgia from September 2017 to September 2022.

Working Experience
Worked at the European Bank for Reconstruction and Development at various positions: 
2015-2017 — Associated Director, Senior Banker, Business Leader in Georgia and Azerbaijan, Department of Financial Institutions, North Africa and the Caucasus Region; 
2007-2015 — Senior Banker, Department of Financial Institutions in the Caucasus, Central Asian and Mongolian Regions, Business Coordinator in Georgia;

2008-2014 was Member of Supervisory Board — TBC Leasing, Georgia; 2012-2008 — Member of the Supervisory Board — Armekonombank, Armenia;

2005-2007 was Deputy Director General and Director General at VTB Bank Georgia; 1998-2003 worked JSC United Georgian Bank at various positions, including Director General; 1996-1998 was Senior Economist at Banking’ Supervision Department at the National Bank of Georgia; In 1997 was Bank Auditor at the Banking Supervision Department of the Federal Reserve Bank of Minneapolis (Minnesota, USA); 1996-1996 was Chief Economist at the Commercial Bank "Krtsanisi" Treasury Operations Department.

Education
1991-1996 — Tbilisi State University, Faculty of Economy, Banking. (2006) Degree of Doctor of Economics (Subject: Ways to Improve Banking Supervision System on Modern Stages).

Besides native Georgian, speaks English and Russian languages.

References

External links
Biography at State Audit Office website

1973 births
Living people
Businesspeople from Tbilisi
Economists from Georgia (country)
Tbilisi State University alumni